Benny Mathews (born June 29, 1970) is an international director who directed the films Dude, Where's the Party? (2003) Santeria (2006), and Geeta in Paridise (2009). He has also directed numerous commercials and music videos for acts including Bone Thugs-n-Harmony, and Houston hip hop artists such as Scarface and Bun B., and Pimp C.  Pimp C's "Knockin' Doorz Down", earned him a nomination for "Best Video" at the 2007 Ozone Magazine Awards.

Music videos

References

External links 

  Benny Mathews webpage

1970 births
Living people
American cinematographers
American people of Malayali descent